Glenn Dean Loucks (July 15, 1935 – October 17, 2014) was an American football player and coach. He was head coach at Fordham University from 1972 to 1974, with a record of 14–14–1, and played quarterback for 
Yale as a member of the Class of 1957. Loucks died in 2014 at the age of 79.

Head coaching record

College

References

1935 births
2014 deaths
American football quarterbacks
Iona Gaels football coaches
Fordham Rams football coaches
Yale Bulldogs football players
High school football coaches in New York (state)
People from White Plains, New York
Sportspeople from Westchester County, New York
Players of American football from New York (state)